C. K. Saseendran is an Indian politician, social worker, dairy farmer, agriculturist and the former MLA of Kalpetta in 14th Kerala Legislative Assembly. He is a member of the Communist Party of India (Marxist).

Political career 
Saseendran entered politics through the students' movements of the Communist Party of India (Marxist). He became a full member of the party in 1981 and has worked as area secretary of CPI(M) for Kalpetta and Mananthavady, and is a District Committee (DC) member. In addition, he has served as the district secretary of CPI(M), convenor of Adivasi Bhoo Samrakshana Samiti, and a member of Kerala State Karshaka Thozhilali Union (KSKTU). Saseendran is seen as a champion of the tribals, who make up a considerable proportion of the population of Wayanad (the district he comes from), and has been at the forefront of numerous agitations for the landless tribals.

Personal life 
Saseendran comes from Arinjermala, near Kalpetta. He is married to C. Usha, a part-time bank employee, and they have two children, Gautham and Anagha.

References

External links
  KERALA LEGISLATURE - MEMBERS- 14th KERALA LEGISLATIVE ASSEMBLY

Living people
Kerala MLAs 2016–2021
Communist Party of India (Marxist) politicians from Kerala
People from Wayanad district
Social workers from Kerala
Social workers
Indian farmers
1958 births